Novovoskresenovka is a rural locality (a selo) and the administrative center of Novovoskresenovsky Selsoviet of Shimanovsky District, Amur Oblast, Russia. The population was 506 as of 2018. There are 13 streets.

Geography 
Novovoskresenovka is located 135 km west of Shimanovsk (the district's administrative centre) by road. Anosovo is the nearest rural locality.

References 

Rural localities in Shimanovsky District